Prasophyllum gilgai, commonly known as the gilgai leek orchid, is a species of orchid endemic to Victoria. It has a single tubular green leaf and up to twenty greenish brown, light brown, pink or white flowers. It is a very rare orchid with a population of fewer than fifty plants in a small area in the north of the state.

Description
The flowers are greenish brown, light brown, pink or white and as with others in the genus, are inverted so that the labellum is above the column rather than below it. The dorsal sepal is egg-shaped to lance-shaped and the lateral sepals are linear to lance-shaped and more or less parallel and free from each other. There is a broad, raised, tapering callus in the centre of the labellum. Flowering occurs from October to November.

Taxonomy and naming
Prasophyllum gilgai was first formally described in 2006 by David Jones and Dean Rouse. The description was published in Australian Orchid Research from a specimen collected from near Benalla. The specific epithet (gilgai) refers to the geological formation where this species grows.

Distribution and habitat
This leek orchid grows in gilgai formations near Benalla.

Conservation
Prasophyllum gilgai is listed as Endangered under the Victorian Flora and Fauna Guarantee Act 1988.

References

External links 
 

gilgai
Flora of Victoria (Australia)
Endemic orchids of Australia
Plants described in 2006